Basori Singh Masram (born 29 November 1945, in Village Dugariya, Mandla district) is an Indian politician, belonging to Indian National Congress. In the 2009 election he was elected to the 15th Lok Sabha from the Mandla Lok Sabha constituency of Madhya Pradesh.

He was earlier Sarpanch for Gram Panchayat Bodar Block Karanjiya.  During 1993-1998 he was member of Madhya Pradesh Assembly.

He is an agriculturist and resides at Dindori district. He is married to Jeera bai and has two daughters and two sons.

References

External links
 Fifteenth Lok Sabha Members Bioprofile in Lok Sahba website

India MPs 2009–2014
1945 births
Living people
People from Madhya Pradesh
People from Mandla district
Indian National Congress politicians
People from Dindori district
Madhya Pradesh MLAs 1993–1998
Lok Sabha members from Madhya Pradesh
Indian National Congress politicians from Madhya Pradesh